Azyumardi Azra,  (4 March 1955 – 18 September 2022) was an Indonesian public intellectual, Muslim scholar and Rector of Syarif Hidayatullah State Islamic University Jakarta. He graduated from Department of History, Columbia University in 1992. He was known as a prolific books writer; member of advisory board of a number of international organizations such as UN Democracy Fund (UNDEF), International Institute for Democracy and Electoral Assistance (International IDEA). After serving as Rector at Syarif Hidayatullah State Islamic University Jakarta, he was the Director of Graduate School.

In 2010, he received the title of Commander of the Order of the British Empire, an honorary order from the United Kingdom.

Bibliography 
 Jaringan Ulama (1994)
 Pergolakan Politik Islam (1996)
 Islam Reformis (1999)
 Konteks Berteologi di Indonesia (1999)
 Pendidikan Islam : Tradisi dan Modernisasi Menuju Milenium Baru (1999)
 Esei-Esei Pendidikan Islam, dan Cendikiawan Muslim (1999)
 Renaisans Islam di Asia Tenggara (1999)
 Islam Substantif (2000)
 Historiografi Islam Kontemporer (2002)
 Paradigma Baru Pendidikan Nasional (2002)
 Reposisi Hubungan Agama dan Negara (2002)
 Menggapai Solidaritas (2002)
 Konflik Baru Antar Peradaban (2003)
 Islam Nusantara, Jaringan Global dan Lokal (2003)
 Surau, Pendidikan Islam Tradisional Dalam Transisi dan Modernisasi (2003)
 Shari'a and Politics (2004)
 The Origins of Islamic Reformism in Southeast Asia: Networks of Malay-Indonesian and Middle Eastern 'Ulama' in the Seventeenth and Eighteenth Centuries (2004)
 Islam in the Indonesian World: An Account of Institutional Formation (2006)
 Indonesia, Islam, and Democracy: Dynamics in a Global Context (2006)
 Islam Beyond Conflict: Indonesian Islam and Western Political Theory (2008)
 Varieties of Religious Authority: Changes and Challenges in 20th Century Indonesian Islam (2010)

Honours

References

External links 
 
 http://azyumardiazra.lec.uinjkt.ac.id/
 Professor Azyumardi Azra - Melbourne Law School

1955 births
2022 deaths
People from Padang Pariaman Regency
Indonesian Muslims
Minangkabau people
20th-century Indonesian historians
Commanders of the Order of the British Empire
Syarif Hidayatullah State Islamic University Jakarta alumni
Columbia University alumni
21st-century Indonesian historians